Luis Enrique Ugueto [oo-geh-to] (born February 15, 1979 in Caracas, Venezuela) is a former Major League Baseball second baseman and switch-hitter who played for the Seattle Mariners in 2002 and 2003.

Originally signed by the Florida Marlins as an amateur free agent in 1996, he was drafted by the Pittsburgh Pirates from Florida in the 2001 Rule 5 draft, and was traded to the Mariners for cash the same day. Finally, he made his debut with the Mariners on April 3, 2002.

Ugueto was a promising young infielder with a strong arm and blistering speed on the bases. What Seattle hoped would develop was his bat and his overall feel for the game, especially defensively, at the major league level. In two seasons as a backup with the Mariners, Ugueto batted .214 with one home run and two RBI in 74 games.

Ugueto signed with the Kansas City Royals prior to the 2005 season and spent the season with the Royals' top minor league club, the Omaha Royals. While with Omaha, he was suspended twice for violating baseball's steroid policy, and he was released by the Royals after the second violation.

After missing the entire 2006 season, Ugueto played with the Minnesota Twins minor league team, the Fort Myers Miracle during the 2007 season. In 2008, he played in Italy's Serie A1 for the Caffè Danesi Nettuno and hit .289. He also shortly played for the Laredo Broncos.

See also
 List of Major League Baseball players from Venezuela

External links
, or Retrosheet, or Pelota Binaria (Venezuelan Winter League)

1979 births
Living people
Águilas del Zulia players
Brevard County Manatees players
Caffe Danesi Nettuno players
Cardenales de Lara players
Caribbean Series managers
Caribes de Anzoátegui players
Dominican Summer League Marlins players
Venezuelan expatriate baseball players in the Dominican Republic
Fort Myers Miracle players
Gulf Coast Marlins players
Kane County Cougars players
Laredo Broncos players
Major League Baseball players from Venezuela
Major League Baseball players suspended for drug offenses
Major League Baseball second basemen
Omaha Royals players
Baseball players from Caracas
Rochester Red Wings players
San Antonio Missions players
Seattle Mariners players
Tacoma Rainiers players
Tigres de Aragua players
Utica Blue Sox players
Venezuelan expatriate baseball players in Italy
Venezuelan expatriate baseball players in the United States
Yuma Scorpions players